Céline Dion chante Noël (Céline Dion Sings Christmas) is the second French-language studio album by Canadian singer Celine Dion, released in Quebec, Canada on 4 December 1981. It is also her first Christmas album.

Content
The album was released three weeks after Dion's debut longplay and contained traditional Christmas carols. Tracks "Glory Alleluia", "Promenade en traîneau" and "Joyeux Noël" also appeared on Dion's second Christmas album, Chants et contes de Noël (1983). In 1993, Dion recorded an English version of "Joyeux Noël" with its original English lyrics for David Foster's The Christmas Album. This recording of "The Christmas Song" appeared later on her 1998 album, These Are Special Times. Dion also recorded a new version of "Petit Papa Noël" with Alvin and the Chipmunks in 1994, for their album A Very Merry Chipmunk.

Commercial performance
Although there were no singles issued to promote it, Céline Dion Chante Noël and La voix du bon Dieu sold 30,000 copies in 1981 and would go on to sell about 125,000 copies the following year.

Track listing
All tracks produced by René Angélil.

Release history

References

External links
 

1981 Christmas albums
Celine Dion albums
Christmas albums by Canadian artists
Pop Christmas albums
Albums produced by René Angélil